Awake in a Dream may refer to:
 Awake in a Dream (album), an album by Eleven
 Awake in a Dream (song), a single by Kalan Porter